Kedar Mahadev Jadhav (born 26 March 1985) is an Indian cricketer who plays for Maharashtra and has also played for the Indian national cricket team. He is a batting all-rounder who bats right-handed and bowls right-arm off-break, and occasionally keeps wickets. In the Indian Premier League, he played for Chennai Super Kings, Royal Challengers Bangalore, Sunrisers Hyderabad, Delhi Daredevils and Kochi Tuskers Kerala.

Jadhav made his One Day International (ODI) debut for India against Sri Lanka on 16 November 2014 and his T20I debut for India against Zimbabwe on 17 July 2015. He was ranked seventh in The Times of India's Top 20 Most Desirable Men of Maharashtra in 2017.

Early life 
Jadhav was born on 26 March 1985 in Pune into a middle-class family which originally hails from Jadhavwadi in Madha in Solapur district. He is the youngest of four children. His father Mahadev Jadhav was employed as a clerk with the Maharashtra State Electricity Board until his retirement in 2003.

Jadhav lives in the western Pune locality of Kothrud and started playing cricket at the PYC Hindu Gymkhana. He initially represented Rainbow Cricket Club in tennis ball cricket tournaments, before getting selected for the Maharashtra under-19 team in 2004.

Domestic career 

In October 2019, Jadhav was named in India B's squad for the 2019–20 Deodhar Trophy.

International career 
In April 2019, Jadhav was named in India's squad for the 2019 Cricket World Cup.

Indian Premier League
Jadhav, who was initially in the Royal Challengers Bangalore (RCB) development squad, was signed by Delhi Daredevils in 2010. He made an immediate impact as he scored a 29-ball 50 for Delhi against RCB on his IPL debut. The following season, he was signed by new franchise Kochi Tuskers Kerala, for whom he played only six matches that year. In 2013, he was re-signed by Delhi but was not retained by Delhi in the 2014 IPL auction before being bought back by the team for 20 million scoring 149 runs in 10 innings in 2014 for Delhi.

Ahead of the 2016 IPL, Jadhav was traded to Royal Challengers Bangalore for an undisclosed amount. In 2018, he was picked by Chennai Super Kings but was ruled out of the tournament after tearing his hamstring in the opening match against Mumbai Indians. In February 2021, Jadhav was bought by the Sunrisers Hyderabad in the IPL auction ahead of the 2021 Indian Premier League for INR 2 crores. He went unsold in the 2022 IPL auctions.

References

External links 

Kedar Jadhav's profile page on Wisden

1985 births
Living people
Indian cricketers
India One Day International cricketers
India Twenty20 International cricketers
Maharashtra cricketers
Royal Challengers Bangalore cricketers
Delhi Capitals cricketers
Kochi Tuskers Kerala cricketers
India Blue cricketers
India Green cricketers
West Zone cricketers
India Red cricketers
Cricketers from Pune
Chennai Super Kings cricketers
Cricketers at the 2019 Cricket World Cup
Wicket-keepers